Raymond Petrie White (November 26, 1910 in Brooklyn, New York – August 17, 1995 in Norfolk, Virginia) was a minor league baseball pitcher and manager. He played from 1933 to 1940, going 55–37 in 170 games. Over the course of his six-year career, he threw 877 innings. In 1934, he went 17–9 while splitting the season between the Norfolk Tars and Binghamton Triplets.

In his first year of managing, he led the Bassett Furnituremakers to a league championship in 1937. He took the helm for the Norfolk Tars and led them to a playoff appearance in 1938, however they lost in the first round. He led them until 1940, when he was replaced partway through the season by Phil Page. He last managed for the Augusta Tigers in 1940, replacing the same Phil Page who took his job in Norfolk. 

He managed future Hall of Famer Phil Rizzuto.

References

1910 births
1995 deaths
Minor league baseball managers
Minor league baseball players
Baseball players from New York (state)